This is a list of the cotton and other textile mills in Derbyshire, England. The first mills were built in the 1760s in the Derwent Valley by Arkwright and Strutt, and were powered by the water of the River Derwent. The abundance of water from the River Etherow and its tributaries led to mills being built in Longdendale and Glossopdale, and similarly along the River Wye in Millers Dale. As the industry developed, the mills changed hands, were demolished, were converted to use steam, or consolidated into larger units. They changed their names and their functions. Water-powered mills were smaller than the later steam-powered mills found in Greater Manchester. Parts of Derbyshire have been subsumed into Stockport.

Longdendale

Derwent Valley

This includes Derby, and Belper

River Wye

The mills of New Mills and Rowarth

Rowarth Brook

River Goyt

River Sett

Also known as River Kinder.

Peak Forest Canal

Other

References

External links

 
Derbyshire
Lists of buildings and structures in Derbyshire